Itsuki Lullaby (in  ) is a lullaby known widely in Japan, and is a folk song representative of Itsuki Village, Kuma District, Kumamoto Prefecture, on Kyūshū Island.

Lyrics

There are the most common version and the original version of this lullaby, sung in the Itsuki Village dialect.

Most common version

Original version

Origin
The lullaby was rediscovered by a school teacher in 1935, long after the song ceased to be sung.

It has long been believed that this song was sung by babysitters from poor families.  Itsuki was next to Gokanosho, where the Heike people came to settle after their defeat in the Genji-Heike War in the Heian period and later the Kamakura shogunate sent their Genji samurai families to watch over them, thus creating the rich Genji families and poorer Heike families.

See also

 Lullaby
 Folk song
 Itsuki Village, Kuma District, Kumamoto Prefecture, Kyūshū Island, Japan
 Other Japanese lullabies: Edo Lullaby, Takeda Lullaby, Chugoku Region Lullaby, Shimabara Lullaby, etc.

References

External links
 https://www.youtube.com/results?search_query=Julian+Lloyd+Webber+itsuki (performance for cello and piano)
 The common version of Itsuki Lullaby（Sung by Shirley Yamaguchi, YouTube）
 The original version of Itsuki Lullaby（Sung by Harue Momoyama, YouTube）
 An arrangement for voice, shakuhachi, piano, and crystal bowls

Japanese folk music
Lullabies
Kumamoto Prefecture